Kachakanoor is a panchayat village in the southern state of Karnataka, India. Administratively, Kachakanoor is under  Shorapur Taluka of Yadgir District in Karnataka.  The village of Kachakanoor is 5 km by road east of the village of Yedhalli and 13 km by road west of the village of Peth Ammapur. The nearest railhead is in Yadgir.

There are five villages in the gram panchayat: Kachaknoor, Bachimatti, Benkanhalli, Chikanhalli, and Kurbantalahalli.

Demographics 
At the 2001 census, the village of Kachakanoor had 1,253 inhabitants, with 610 males and 643 females.

Notes

External links 
 

Villages in Yadgir district